Zhang Rujing, alternatively known as Richard Chang Ru-gin, is a Chinese businessman and entrepreneur known for founding the largest contract chip manufacturer in mainland China, the Semiconductor Manufacturing International Corporation (SMIC). In mainland China, Zhang is known as "the father of China's foundry industry" and China's "godfather of semiconductors".

Early life and education 
Zhang Rujing was born in 1948 in the city of Nanjing, Jiangsu Province (then in the Republic of China) to a steelworker, Zhang Xilun, and his wife Liu Peijin. Less than a year old, Zhang and his family fled with the retreating Kuomintang aboard a boat to Kaohsiung on the southern coast of Taiwan in 1949, reportedly to his mother's great distress. Growing up in Kaohsiung, Zhang excelled in his studies and was admitted to study at Taiwan's number-one-ranked university, National Taiwan University (NTU) in the capital, Taipei. After graduating from NTU's Mechanical Engineering Department in 1970, Zhang moved to the United States where he earned his master's degree in engineering from University at Buffalo's School of Engineering and, as soon as his newly-wed American wife completed her masters, moved to Southern Methodist University in Texas to earn his doctorate in electrical engineering.

Career 
In 1977, at 29 years old, Zhang began working at the semi-conductor giant Texas Instruments alongside experts in integrated circuits with his first boss having been Nobel Prize in Physics laureate Jack Kilby. Starting as a design engineer, during his twenty formative years at Texas Instruments, Zhang would develop under the mentorship of his boss, Dr. Shao Zifan, and help establish large-scale microchip factories including four in Texas, and others in Italy, Japan, Singapore, and Taiwan. Zhang would bring his then retired parents to the United States from Taiwan. Coincidentally, Zhang Zhangmou, to-be founder of today's largest dedicated pure-play semiconductor foundry, Taiwan Semiconductor Manufacturing Company (TSMC), also worked at Texas Instruments, though the two never crossed-paths. In 1996, leaders from a visiting delegation from the now-defunct Chinese Ministry of Electronics Industry approached Zhang in the United States and, noting China's twenty-year gap in semiconductor manufacture, encouraged Zhang to return to mainland China and help his birth nation establish their own chip fabrication industry. In 1997, after twenty years of work at Texas Instruments and with prodding from his father to return to their homeland, Zhang agreed. Zhang's decision to bring his expertise back to develop the industry in his birth country is likened to Qian Xuesen, who returned from the United States to establish the People's Republic of China's rocket program.

Establishment of SMIC 

Returning first to mainland China at age 50, Zhang explored the potential for a Chinese semiconductor factory but deemed the timing inopportune for the country. Zhang then decided to travel back to Taiwan and founded Shida Semiconductor with the help of his contacts at Texas Instruments. As TSMC expanded in Taiwan, its head, Zhang Zhongmou, convinced TSMC shareholders in 2000 to acquire Shida Semiconductor for $5 billion USD. Zhang Zhongmou, reportedly appreciative of Zhang Rujing's talent and expertise, requested that Zhang Rujing continue to lead Shida Semiconductor, a deal Zhang Rujing accepted on the purported condition that a factory one day be built in mainland China. Learning that Zhang Zhongmou did not intend to establish a factory in mainland China, in 2000, Zhang Rujing resigned, gave up his shares of TSMC, and travelled to the PRC capital of Beijing. Finding neither the city's mayor or vice mayor for science and technology who weren't in the city at that time, Zhang met with Deputy Directory of the Shanghai Economic Commission Jiang Shangzhou who brought Zhang south to Shanghai and introduced him to Zhangjiang Hi-Tech Park. That year, on 3 April 2000, Zhang founded the Semiconductor Manufacturing International Corporation (SMIC). By May, Zhang had recruited hundreds of engineers to Shanghai and construction of the plant began in August 2000. Zhang also moved both his mother (then over 90 years of age) and his American wife to mainland China. Zhang also reportedly built a 1,500 unit housing area for his employees and a bilingual K-12 school for children of employees.

Resignation 
Already experienced in the establishment of semiconductor factories, Zhang continued to expand SMIC by building three 8 inch wafer factories in Shanghai, two 12 inch factories in Beijing, and purchased an 8 inch factory in Tianjin from Motorola. In 2002, the Taiwanese government, allegedly feeling pressure from SMIC's primary competitor, TSMC, ordered Zhang to withdraw his investment. After Zhang's refusal, the government fined him 15 million Taiwanese dollars threatening to bring more fines should Zhang not desist. In August 2003, as SMIC planned to launch in Hong Kong, TSMC to sued SMIC in the United States courts for intellectual property theft and patent infringement. In 2005, SMIC was ordered to pay US$175 million to TSMC in damages, surrender TSMC documents, and halt the use of TSMC technology and processes in SMIC's fabrication. Later, in a separate lawsuit, a California jury would find that SMIC breached the terms of the 2005 settlement by not returning documents and disclosing TSMC trade secrets in patent applications. Along with a compensation of $200 million USD and 10% equity given by SMIC to TSMC in 2009, Zhang, then 61, was prohibited from operating in the chip industry for a period of three years.

Later life 
In 2014, having passed his three-year prohibition from the semiconductor industry, a 66-year-old Zhang founded Shanghai Xinsheng, the first 300 mm large silicon wafer company in mainland China. In 2018, Zhang established SiEn (Qingdao) Integrated Circuits which, in 2021, began producing 8 inch silicon wafers and was testing 12 inch production. Zhang has continued to play an active role in the advocacy of the People's Republic of China's chip industry. Zhang has expressed his confidence that China would catch up to global leaders in the industries of third-generation gallium nitride (GaN) and silicon carbide (SiC) semiconductors. SiEn, meanwhile, has discussed potential partnerships with Huawei Technologies to allow access to semiconductor development services in what the Japanese Financial Newspaper Nikkei asserts is an attempt "to plug holes in its semiconductor supply chain caused by the U.S. crackdown on the tech giant".

References 

1948 births
Businesspeople from Nanjing
Texas Instruments people
Living people
Taiwanese company founders
20th-century Taiwanese businesspeople
21st-century Taiwanese businesspeople
Businesspeople from Jiangsu
University at Buffalo alumni
Southern Methodist University alumni
National Taiwan University alumni
Electrical engineers